This was the second of two editions of the tournament in the 2021 tennis season. Mackenzie McDonald was the defending champion but lost in the second round to Tomáš Macháč.

Macháč won the title after defeating Sebastian Ofner 4–6, 6–4, 6–4 in the final.

Seeds

Draw

Finals

Top half

Bottom half

References

External links
Main draw
Qualifying draw

Nur-Sultan Challenger II - 1